The Philips Plaque was awarded annually to the player with the best faceoff percentage in the Quebec Major Junior Hockey League. The award was initiated in 1997–98, and discontinued in 2001–02.

Winners

External links
 QMJHL official site List of trophy winners.

Quebec Major Junior Hockey League trophies and awards